Daniel Howard (born December 13, 1984) is a rugby league footballer who plays for the Wentworthville Magpies in the Intrust Super Premiership. He also plays for the United States national rugby league team, where he was named in the 2013 Rugby League World Cup qualifying squad.

Background
Howard was born in Los Angeles, California, United States. He is the brother of fellow USA international Steve Howard. In 2015, Daniel played for the United States in their 2017 Rugby League World Cup qualifiers.

References

External links

2017 RLWC profile

1984 births
Living people
American rugby league players
Rugby league props
Rugby league second-rows
Sportspeople from Los Angeles
United States national rugby league team players
Wentworthville Magpies players